Green Lake is a lake in Kandiyohi County, Minnesota.

Green Lake was named in the 1850s for its greenish color of its water.

References

Lakes of Minnesota
Lakes of Kandiyohi County, Minnesota